Paul Lambert (January 8, 1908 – October 28, 1996) was a French water polo player who competed in the 1936 Summer Olympics. He was part of the French team which finished fourth in the 1936 tournament. He played all seven matches.

References

External links
part 2 the water polo tournament
Paul Lambert's profile at Sports Reference.com

1908 births
1996 deaths
French male water polo players
Olympic water polo players of France
Water polo players at the 1936 Summer Olympics